The  (plural ), in Irish  is a fairy creature from Celtic mythology, said to resemble a large black cat with a white spot on its chest. Legend has it that the spectral cat haunts the Scottish Highlands. The legends surrounding this creature are more common in Scottish folklore, but a few occur in Irish.

The  may have been inspired by the Scottish wildcat itself.

Appearance
The  is all black with the exception of a white spot on its chest. It is described as being as large as a dog and chooses to display itself with its back arched and bristles erect.

The King of the Cats
In the British folk tale "The King of the Cats", a man comes home to tell his wife and cat, Old Tom, that he saw nine black cats with white spots on their chests carrying a coffin with a crown on it and one of the cats tells the man to "Tell Tom Tildrum that Tim Toldrum is dead." Old Tom then exclaims, "What?! Old Tim dead! Then I'm the King o' the Cats!" The cat then climbs up the chimney and is never seen again.

Soul-stealing

Samhain
On Samhain, it was believed that a  would bless any house that left a saucer of milk out for it to drink and those houses that did not put out a saucer of milk would be cursed into having all of their cows' udders go dry.

Summoning 
The demonic  called Big Ears could be summoned (Gaelic  ) to appear and grant any wish to those who took part in the ceremony. The ceremony required practitioners to burn the bodies of cats over the course of four days and nights.

Transformation
If one of these witches chose to go back into their cat form for the ninth time, they would remain a cat for the rest of their lives. It is believed by some that this is how the idea of a cat having nine lives originated.

See also
  
 Beast of Bodmin
 
 
 Kellas cat
 List of fictional cats
 Phantom cat
 "The Black Cat" (short story)

References

Aos Sí
Cat folklore
Fairies
Fantasy creatures
Irish folklore
Irish legendary creatures
Mythological felines
Scottish legendary creatures
Scottish mythology
Tuatha Dé Danann
Witchcraft in folklore and mythology